Pungnap-dong is a neighbourhood, dong of Songpa-gu, Seoul, South Korea.

Education
Schools located in Pungnap-dong:
 Seoul Poongsung Elementary School
 Seoul Pungnap Elementary School
 Seoul Tosung Elementary School
 Pung Sung Middle School
 Pungnap Middle School
 Youngpa Girls' Middle School
 Youngpa Girls' High School

Transportation 
 Gangdong-gu Office station of

See also
Pungnap Toseong
Administrative divisions of South Korea

References

External links
 Pungnap 1-dong resident center website
 Songpa-gu map

Neighbourhoods of Songpa District